Adhyayan Suman (born 13 January 1988) is an Indian actor and singer who appears in Hindi language films. He debuted in 2008 with Haal–e–dil. His second film was Raaz – The Mystery Continues was a semi-hit. Suman's was praised for his performance in the 2009 Mukesh Bhatt film Jashnn.

Personal life
Suman was born in Mumbai to Bollywood actor Shekhar Suman and Alka Suman. He had an older brother Aayush who died in 1994. His father publicly revealed that Adhyanan went through the phase of depression and he was having suicidal thoughts as Bollywood created a lot of hurdles for him.

On 11 March 2021, Suman revealed that he broke up with Splitsvilla 11 fame Maera Mishra after being in the relationship for two years.

Career
Suman debuted in the Bollywood film industry in 2008 with Haal–e–dil which was directed by Anil Devgan and produced by Kumar Mangat. His second film was Raaz – The Mystery Continues, a semi-hit, directed by Mohit Suri and produced by Mukesh Bhatt. His third film Jashnn was also with Mukesh Bhatt and his performance in the film was critically acclaimed.

Suman's latest release was his father Shekhar Suman's failed directorial venture Heartless.
A film based on romantic medical thriller and also explored the sensitive topic of anaesthesia and its awareness.

Pursuing a singing career, Suman's first single was "Saareyan Nu Chaddeya". His last release was the recreated version of Arjun Kanungo's - "Aaya Na Tu", "Aaya Na Tu 2.0". Suman also announced his own music channel AS Music with the release of "Aaya Na Tu 2.0" and wants to assist talents across the globe in showcasing their talent and providing them with a platform which will guide them in producing their own music and making them reach out to the right target audience.

His recent release is Soniyo 2.0

Filmography

Web series

References

External links

 
 
 

Indian male film actors
Indian male voice actors
Male actors in Hindi cinema
Living people
Male actors from Mumbai
1988 births